Vladan Milosavljević (born 4 March 1980) is a Serbian footballer, currently playing for FK Vardar as a midfielder.
Vladan is deployed as a defensive or central midfielder.

Milosavljević started to play football in FK Partizan youth teams. When he was  18 years old he signed a professional contract with FK Obilić, with whom he was Champion of Serbia for the 1997/98 season.

Between 1999 and 2001 Vladan was a part of the Serbia national under-21 football team.

After spending the first six years of his career in his home country with FK Obilić, FK Voždovac and FK Zemun,  Milosavljević relocated to Bulgaria in June 2004, signing a contract with Cherno More Varna.
In the next year Vladan transferred to FK Makedonija Gjorče Petrov, with whom he won the 2006 Macedonian Cup. Because of his good displays Milosavljević was named the 2007 Foreign Footballer of the Year in Macedonia.

In 2008, he played for six months in Bulgarian Beroe Stara Zagora. In June 2008 Milosavljević returned to Serbia and signed with FK Voždovac playing in Serbian Second League.
In June 2009 Vladan signed a contract with best Macedonian football club FK Vardar.

External links
 Official website
  Foreign Footballer of the Year in Macedonia - 2007
 Најдобрите за 2007 година 
 7sport.net
 Гол.бг
 Топспорт

1980 births
Living people
Serbian footballers
Serbian expatriate footballers
FK Obilić players
FK Voždovac players
FK Železnik players
FK Zemun players
First Professional Football League (Bulgaria) players
Expatriate footballers in Bulgaria
PFC Cherno More Varna players
PFC Beroe Stara Zagora players
FK Vardar players
Expatriate footballers in North Macedonia
Association football midfielders
Serbian expatriate sportspeople in Bulgaria